A magic club is any group of local magicians who meet regularly. A club can be open to all with an interest in magic or it may be only possible to join by invite or by meeting some sort of notability criteria (e.g. professional magicians only). Some clubs may specialize in types of magic, or be primarily youth oriented.

Most magic clubs will charge a fee for membership. Fees will vary from club to club, depending on what services are offered.

Magic clubs
 The Magic Castle, private clubhouse for the Academy of Magical Arts (Hollywood, USA)
 Magicopolis (Santa Monica, USA)
 Magic Club of Vienna (Austria)
 The Magic Circle, London-based society
 Pentacle Club (Cambridge)
 Portsmouth and District Magic Circle (England)
 Brotherhood of Auckland Magicians, New Zealand

Former magic clubs
 Future American Magical Entertainers, important New York club for teens from the 1940s to 1980's
 Magic Towne House, important New York club

Magic organizations
Although larger than local clubs, these allow amateurs magicians to become members. Many local clubs are affiliated with these and require membership in one of them as a prerequisite.
 Academy of Magical Arts
 Australian Institute of Magic
 Australian Society of Magicians, it is the oldest Magical Society in the Southern Hemisphere and the fourth oldest in the world (Australia)
 International Brotherhood of Magicians
 Society of American Magicians
 International Magicians Society
 Society of Young Magicians

See also
 Magic convention

References

External links